Sesame Street: 25 Wonderful Years is the home video version of Sesame Street Jam: A Musical Celebration, a special aired on PBS during their pledge drive on March 6, 1994, that commemorates Sesame Street’s 25th anniversary in 1994. This program was originally released on October 29, 1993, under the title Sesame Street's 25th Birthday: A Musical Celebration!. 25 Wonderful Years focused on celebrity segments, many coming from segments filmed for the show's upcoming 25th season, of artists such as En Vogue and Ladysmith Black Mambazo.

Plot
While noticing the many talents that people have throughout Central Park, Telly, Prairie Dawn, and Big Bird get the idea to put on a big show. They audition dancers and "la-la"-ers (singers). However, when the Amazing Mumford attempts to audition, he makes everyone sound like different animals. In between, classic Sesame Street songs are shown, such as "Count It Higher", "I Love Trash", "Rubber Duckie", "C is for Cookie", "Adventure", and "I Don't Want to Live on the Moon". All hope begins to be lost for the show as the auditions fail, as Big Bird sings "Sing" all by himself. Then, Ladysmith Black Mambazo comes in by singing the "la la la la" part. Soon enough, everyone starts singing with him, making the show successful after all.

Cast

Live-action cast
 Carlo Alban as Carlo
 Alison Bartlett as Gina
 Annette Calud as Celina
 Savion Glover as Savion
 Angel Jemmott as Angela
 Sonia Manzano as Maria
 Bob McGrath as Bob 
 Jou Jou Papailler as Jamal

The Muppets of Sesame Street and voice cast
 Caroll Spinney as Big Bird and Oscar the Grouch
 Frank Oz as Bert, Grover, and Cookie Monster
 Jerry Nelson as The Count, The Amazing Mumford, Boy, Martian #1, Biff and Herry Monster
 Jim Henson as Ernie, Kermit the Frog, Little Chrissy (puppetry) and Guy Smiley (archive footage)
 Martin P. Robinson as Telly, Fish
 Fran Brill as Prairie Dawn and Little Bird
 Kevin Clash as Elmo, Baby Natasha, Orange AM Monster, and Hoots the Owl
 David Rudman as Humphrey, Chicago the Lion, Martian #2, and Davey Monkey
 Joe Mazzarino as Joey Monkey and Merry Monster
Pam Arciero as Telly Monster (assistant)
 James Kroupa as Bird in La La Line
 Jim Martin as Goat
 Richard Hunt as Gladys the Cow (archive footage)

Additional Muppets performed and voiced by Noel MacNeal, Bryant Young, Stephanie D'Abruzzo and Alice Dinnean.

Songs
 "Sesame Street Theme" (Calypso) - The Kids
 "Adventure" - En Vogue
 "The Batty Bat" - The Count, Ftatateeta and his bats
 "The Alligator King" - Bud Luckey
 "I Love Trash" (remade version) (introduction cut out/new sound effect added at the end) - Oscar the Grouch
 "Count it Higher" - Little Chrissy and the Alphabets
 Montage of Ernie songs:
 "Rubber Duckie"
 "The Honker-Duckie-Dinger Jamboree"
 "Put Down the Duckie"
 "Do De Rubber Duck"
 "C Is For Cookie" - Cookie Monster 
 "Monster in the Mirror" - Grover 
 "I'm an Aardvark" (re-filmed version) - Joe Raposo
 "Fuzzy and Blue and Orange" (cuts off before Frazzle appears/new sound effects added) - Grover, Herry, and Cookie Monster
 "Skin" - Kevin Clash
 "It's Not Easy Bein' Green" - Kermit the Frog
 "Happy Tappin' with Elmo" (introduction and closing cut out) - Elmo
 "Doin' the Pigeon" (introduction edited) - Bert
 "Dance Myself to Sleep" - Bert & Ernie 
 "Feel the Beat" (Part 1 only)
 "I Don't Want to Live on the Moon"  (introduction cut out) - Ernie
 "We Are All Earthlings" - The Sesame Street Animals
 "Sing" - Ladysmith Black Mambazo

See also
 List of American films of 1993

External links

1993 television specials
Sesame Street features
1990s American television specials
Central Park
Films directed by Jon Stone
1993 films
1990s English-language films
1990s American films